Klaus Konrad may refer to:

 Klaus Konrad, a nom de plume of Charles Whiting (1926-2007), British novelist and historian
 Klaus Konrad (footballer), German footballer in 1975–76 Tennis Borussia Berlin season
 Klaus Konrad (politician), see Eugenio Calò

See Also 
 Klaus Conrad, a German neurologist